Pedro José de Galíndez Vallejo (1891 – 2 October 1971) was a sailor from Spain, who represented his country at the 1928 Summer Olympics in Amsterdam, Netherlands.

References

Sources

External links
 

1891 births
1971 deaths
Sailors at the 1928 Summer Olympics – 6 Metre
Olympic sailors of Spain
Spanish male sailors (sport)
People from Portugalete
Sailors (sport) from the Basque Country (autonomous community)
Sportspeople from Biscay